The red-bellied short-necked turtle (Emydura subglobosa), also known commonly as the pink-bellied side-necked turtle and the Jardine River turtle, is a species of turtle in the family Chelidae. The species is native to Australia and Papua New Guinea. There are two recognized subspecies.

Description
E. subglobosa, a hard-shelled chelid, is more colorful than most of its relatives.

Geographic range
E. subglobosa is found in northern Queensland, Australia, and in southern Papua New Guinea.

Habitat
E. subglobosa lives in freshwater rivers and swamps, and also in lagoons and lakes.

In captivity
The red-bellied short-necked turtle is popular as a pet. A 75-gallon or larger aquarium is used to house this species. In captivity, it feeds on fish, commercial turtle pellets, and plant matter.

Due to Australia's ban of exporting wild-caught animals, all wild-caught individuals are from New Guinea. In Florida in the United States, E. globosa had been bred to supply the market. Hong Kong and Taiwan had also bred the red-bellied short-necked turtle.

References

External links
 Asian Turtle Trade Working Group (2000). Emydura subglobosa. IUCN Red List of Threatened Species. Retrieved 29 July 2007.
 Werneburg I, Hugi J, Müller J, Sánchez-Villagra MR (2009). "Embryogenesis and ossification of Emydura subglobosa (Testudines, Pleurodira, Chelidae) and patterns of turtle development". Developmental Dynamics 238 (11): 2770–2786. doi: 10.1002/dvdy.22104 http://onlinelibrary.wiley.com/doi/10.1002/dvdy.22104/full
 Werneburg I (2011). "The cranial musculature of turtles". Palaeontologia Electronia 14.2.15A: 99 pages. http://palaeo-electronica.org/2011_2/254/index.html

Emydura
Reptiles described in 1876
Taxonomy articles created by Polbot
Turtles of Australia